A secundative language is a language in which the recipients of ditransitive verbs (which takes a subject and two objects: a theme and a recipient) are treated like the patients (targets) of monotransitive verbs (verbs that take only one object),  and the themes get distinct marking. Secundative languages contrast with indirective languages, where the recipient is treated in a special way.

While English is mostly not a secundative language, there are some examples. The sentence John gave Mary the ball uses this construction, where the ball is the theme and Mary is the recipient.

The alternative wording John presented Mary with the ball is essentially analogous to the structure found in secundative languages; the ball is not the direct object here, but basically a secondary object marked by the preposition with. In German, the prefix be- (which is sometimes likened to an applicative voice) can be used to change the valency of verbs in a similar way: In John schenkte Mary den Ball, the theme Ball is the direct object and the recipient Mary the indirect object (in the dative case); in John beschenkte Mary mit dem Ball, the recipient Mary is now the direct object and the theme Ball is now an oblique argument (an oblique dative) marked by the preposition mit.

Terminology 
This language type was called dechticaetiative in an article by Edward L. Blansitt, Jr. (from Greek dekhomai 'take, receive' and an obscure second element, unlikely kaitoi 'and indeed'), but that term did not catch on. They have also been called anti-ergative languages and primary object languages.

Usage 
Ditransitive verbs have two arguments other than the subject: a theme that undergoes the action and a recipient that receives the theme (see thematic relation). In a secundative language, the recipient of a ditransitive verb is treated in the same way as the single object of a monotransitive verb, and this syntactic category is called primary object, which is equivalent to the indirect object in English. The theme of a ditransitive verb is treated separately and called secondary object, which is equivalent to the direct object.

English is not a true secundative language, as neither the theme nor recipient is primary, or either can be primary depending on context.

A true secundative construction is found in West Greenlandic, the direct object of a monotransitive verb appears in the absolutive case:

In a ditransitive sentence, the recipient appears in absolutive case and the theme is marked with the instrumental case:

Similarly, in Lahu, both the patient of a monotransitive verb and the recipient of a ditransitive verb are marked with the postposition thàʔ:

In secundative languages with passive constructions, passivation promotes the primary object to subject.  For example, in Swahili:

the recipient Fatuma is promoted to subject and not the theme zawadi 'gift'.

Use in English
Many languages show mixed indirective/secundative behavior. English, which is primarily indirective, arguably contains secundative constructions, traditionally referred to as dative shift. For example, the passive of the sentence

John gave Mary the ball.

is

Mary was given the ball by John.

in which the recipient rather than the theme is promoted to subject.  This is complicated by the fact that some dialects of English may promote either the recipient (Mary) or the theme (the ball) argument to subject status, and for these dialects '

The ball was given Mary by John.

(meaning that the ball was given to Mary) is also well-formed.  In addition, the argument structure of verbs like provide is essentially secundative: in

The project provides young people with work.

the recipient argument is treated like a monotransitive direct object.

Notes

See also 
 Object (grammar)
 Dative
 Ergativity
 Ditransitive verb
 Morphosyntactic alignment

References 
 Blansitt, E.L. Jr. (1984). "Dechticaetiative and dative". In Objects, F. Plank (Ed.), 127–150. London: Academic Press.
 Comrie, Bernard (1975). "Antiergative." Papers from the 11th Regional Meeting of the Chicago Linguistic Society, R. E. Grossman, L. J. San, & T. J. Vance (eds.), 112-121.
 Dryer, Matthew S. (1986). "Primary objects, secondary objects, and antidative." Language 62:808-845.
 Haspelmath, Martin (2013). "Ditransitive Constructions: The Verb 'Give'." In: Dryer, Matthew S. & Haspelmath, Martin (eds.) The World Atlas of Language Structures Online. Leipzig: Max Planck Institute for Evolutionary Anthropology.
 LaPolla, Randy (1992). "Anti-ergative Marking in Tibeto-Burman.” Linguistics of the Tibeto-Burman Area 15.1(1992):1-9.
 Malchukov, Andrej & Haspelmath, Martin & Comrie, Bernard (eds.) (2010). Studies in ditransitive constructions. Berlin: De Gruyter Mouton.
 Trask, R. L. (1993). A Dictionary of Grammatical Terms in Linguistics Routledge, 

Linguistic typology